Tres Equis is a district of the Turrialba canton, in the Cartago province of Costa Rica.

History 
Tres Equis was created on 25 April 1994.

Geography 
Tres Equis has an area of  km2 and an elevation of  metres.

Demographics 

For the 2011 census, Tres Equis had a population of  inhabitants.

Transportation

Road transportation 
The district is covered by the following road routes:
 National Route 10
 National Route 413

References 

Districts of Cartago Province
Populated places in Cartago Province